Norman Charles Trescowthick,  (18 July 1895 – 23 March 1966) was an Australian flying ace of the First World War credited with seven aerial victories.

References

External links
 
 

1895 births
1966 deaths
Australian Flying Corps officers
Australian recipients of the Distinguished Flying Cross (United Kingdom)
Australian World War I flying aces
Royal Australian Air Force officers
Royal Australian Air Force personnel of World War II
People from Melbourne